Melissa Upreti (born 1969) is a Nepalese lawyer and human rights expert who was the founding attorney and regional director of the Center for Reproductive Rights' Asia program. She is the Senior Director of Program and Global Advocacy at the Center for Women's Global Leadership at Rutgers University and a member of the United Nations Working Group on Discrimination against Women and Girls.

Upreti is a Nepalese citizen born in the United Kingdom. She has a law degree from Nepal and an LL.M. from Columbia Law School. She is a fellow of the University of Toronto Law Faculty's International Reproductive and Sexual Health Law Program. She was a co-petitioner in the case Lakshmi Dhikta v Nepal, which recognised access to abortion as a constitutionally protected right in Nepal.

Upreti has written extensively on reproductive rights.

Selected publications

References

Living people
1969 births
Columbia Law School alumni
Advocates of women's reproductive rights
Rutgers University faculty
United Nations special rapporteurs
Nepalese expatriates in the United States
20th-century Nepalese lawyers
21st-century Nepalese lawyers